Edwin Boyd may refer to:

 Edwin Alonzo Boyd (1914–2002), Canadian criminal
 Citizen Gangster, originally titled Edwin Boyd, a 2011 Canadian film
 Edwin Alonzo Boyd (book), a book by Brian Vallée